The Public Order and Riot Squad (PORS) is the full-time riot squad of the New South Wales Police Force. PORS reports via the Counter Terrorism and Special Tactics Command to the Deputy Commissioner Investigations and Counter Terrorism.

History
The Public Order and Riot Squad (PORS) is a full-time riot squad created in October 2005 becoming operational in January 2006. within the Major Events and Incidents Group Command. PORS was created as a result of Parliamentary reports into the response and handling of riots in Redfern (February 2004) and Macquarie Fields (February 2005) where command and control and resources were criticized and found to be lacking/uncoordinated. PORS is essentially the re-creation of the defunct Tactical Response Group of the 1980s except for some differences in charter and organisation. They are supplemented by statewide-based part-time Operations Support Group units.

In 2009 the squad was featured in an episode of 60 Minutes titled "Brute Force" showing officers in action across Sydney.

In 2017, 47 officers underwent specialist rifle training to become accredited to carry the M4 Carbine assault rifle.

In 2020 and 2021, there were criticisms that officers from the unit were using excessive force while policing protests.

Equipment

PORS are issued with a wide variety of specialised crowd control and riot equipment including Taser weapons and fully equipped black vans and black 4WDs to allow rapid deployment across the State at a moments notice. The vans allow a team in full tactical/riot gear to deploy on the move and access equipment as needed quickly, without need to return to a station to access gear as the part-time Public Order and Operations Support Group (OSG) officers do. 

PORS had an Australian first, a $600,000 purpose built water cannon truck which was fitted with an airtight cabin to protect police from smoke, gas and other irritants. It also had shatterproof "anti-bandit glass" reinforced with wire mesh, and a heavy push bar allowing it to clear barricades and other obstacles. The high pressure 12,000 litre water cannon is able to shoot a stream of water more than 50 metres. The water cannon having never been "used  in anger" was stripped of its police equipment and gifted to Fire and Rescue NSW as a bulk water tanker in 2019. 

Each officer is equipped with more than $8500 in gear including flame retardant overalls, ballistic vests, ballistic goggles, arm and leg guards, capsicum spray, an Asp baton, long baton, utility knife, handcuffs and cable tie flex-cuffs and also rubber bullets which are stored in station and their cars. In June 2017, it was announced that officers in the unit would be armed with semi-automatic rifles. As of 2017 officers are equipped with the M4 carbine.

Roles

The Public Order and Riot Squad specialise in:
riot control/response
search warrants
searches for missing persons
crowd control
IED search
response to major chemical biological and radiological (CBR) incidents and
assisting general duties Police whenever a rapid co-ordinated response is needed at incidents such as brawls or street parties.

PORS role also includes attending major public protests and demonstrations, assisting with searches for evidence, people, property and drugs and canvassing witnesses during large-scale investigations. The unit also clears cells, transfers inmates and performs other security duties during industrial disputes at the State's prisons.

PORS also provide core officers for Operation Vikings. Operation Vikings was designed to provide a highly visible police presence across New South Wales. Large numbers of Police are deployed to these operations, targeting antisocial behaviour, alcohol-related crime, street level drug possession and traffic offences in known trouble (or "hot") spots.

The PORS often deploy large numbers of vehicles and officers to A-League football matches held in New South Wales.

See also
New South Wales Police Force
Operations Support Group
State Protection Group
Public Order Response Team (Victoria)
Riot control
Riot police
Riot shield

References

External links
NSW Police website

Police units of Australia
New South Wales Police Force
2005 establishments in Australia